The list of birds of Texas is the official list of species recorded in the U.S. state of Texas according to the Texas Bird Records Committee (TBRC) of the Texas Ornithological Society. As of August 2022, the list contained  663 species. Of them, 169 are considered review species. Eight species were introduced to Texas, two are known to be extinct and another is thought to be, and a fourth is extirpated and possibly extinct. An additional accidental/historical species has been added from another source.

This list is presented in the taxonomic sequence of the Check-list of North and Middle American Birds, 7th edition through the 63rd Supplement, published by the American Ornithological Society (AOS). Common and scientific names are also those of the Check-list, except that the common names of families are from the Clements taxonomy because the AOS list does not include them.

Unless otherwise noted, all species listed below are considered to occur regularly in Texas as permanent residents, summer or winter visitors, or migrants. These tags are used to annotate some species:

(R) Review species- species "for which documentation for review is requested for any record" by the TBRC 
(I) Introduced – introduced to Texas by humans, directly or indirectly.
(E) Extinct – species which no longer exist
(u) uncertain – per the TBRC, two species have "stable to increasing populations of introduced/native origin"

Ducks, geese, and waterfowl
Order: AnseriformesFamily: Anatidae

Anatidae includes the ducks and most duck-like waterfowl, such as geese and swans. These birds are adapted to an aquatic existence with webbed feet, bills which are flattened to a greater or lesser extent, and feathers that are excellent at shedding water due to special oils.

Black-bellied whistling-duck, Dendrocygna autumnalis
Fulvous whistling-duck, Dendrocygna bicolor
Snow goose, Anser caerulescens
Ross's goose, Anser rossii
Greater white-fronted goose, Anser albifrons
Brant, Branta bernicla (R)
Cackling goose, Branta hutchinsii
Canada goose, Branta canadensis
Trumpeter swan, Cygnus buccinator (R)
Tundra swan, Cygnus columbianus
Muscovy duck, Cairina moschata
Wood duck, Aix sponsa
Garganey, Spatula querquedula (R)
Blue-winged teal, Spatula discors
Cinnamon teal, Spatula cyanoptera
Northern shoveler, Spatula clypeata
Gadwall, Mareca strepera
Eurasian wigeon, Mareca penelope (R)
American wigeon, Mareca americana
Mallard, Anas platyrhynchos
Mexican duck, Anas diazi 
American black duck, Anas rubripes (R)
Mottled duck, Anas fulvigula
White-cheeked pintail, Anas bahamensis (R)
Northern pintail, Anas acuta
Green-winged teal, Anas crecca
Canvasback, Aythya valisineria
Redhead, Aythya americana
Ring-necked duck, Aythya collaris
Greater scaup, Aythya marila
Lesser scaup, Aythya affinis
King eider, Somateria spectabilis (R)
Common eider, Somateria mollissima (R)
Harlequin duck, Histrionicus histrionicus (R)
Surf scoter, Melanitta perspicillata
White-winged scoter, Melanitta deglandi
Black scoter, Melanitta americana
Long-tailed duck, Clangula hyemalis
Bufflehead, Bucephala albeola
Common goldeneye, Bucephala clangula
Barrow's goldeneye, Bucephala islandica (R)
Hooded merganser, Lophodytes cucullatus
Common merganser, Mergus merganser
Red-breasted merganser, Mergus serrator
Masked duck, Nomonyx dominicus (R)
Ruddy duck, Oxyura jamaicensis

Guans, chachalacas, and curassows
Order: GalliformesFamily: Cracidae

The chachalacas, guans, and curassows are birds in the family Cracidae. These are large birds, similar in general appearance to turkeys. The guans and curassows live in trees, but the smaller chachalacas are found in more open scrubby habitats. They are generally dull-plumaged, but the curassows and some guans have colorful facial ornaments.

Plain chachalaca, Ortalis vetula

New World quail
Order: GalliformesFamily: Odontophoridae

The New World quails are small, plump terrestrial birds only distantly related to the quails of the Old World, but named for their similar appearance and habits.

Northern bobwhite, Colinus virginianus
Scaled quail, Callipepla squamata
Gambel's quail, Callipepla gambelii
Montezuma quail, Cyrtonyx montezumae

Pheasants, grouse, and allies
Order: GalliformesFamily: Phasianidae

Phasianidae consists of the pheasants and their allies. These are terrestrial species, variable in size but generally plump with broad relatively short wings. Many species are gamebirds or have been domesticated as a food source for humans.

Wild turkey, Meleagris gallopavo
Greater prairie-chicken, Tympanuchus cupido (RI)
Lesser prairie-chicken, Tympanuchus pallidicinctus
Ring-necked pheasant, Phasianus colchicus (I)

Flamingos
Order: PhoenicopteriformesFamily: Phoenicopteridae

Flamingos filter-feed on shellfish and algae. Their oddly shaped beaks are specially adapted to separate mud and silt from the food they consume and, uniquely, are used upside-down.

American flamingo, Phoenicopterus ruber (R)

Grebes
Order: PodicipediformesFamily: Podicipedidae

Grebes are small to medium-large freshwater diving birds. They have lobed toes and are excellent swimmers and divers. However, they have their feet placed far back on the body, making them quite ungainly on land.

Least grebe, Tachybaptus dominicus
Pied-billed grebe, Podilymbus podiceps
Horned grebe, Podiceps auritus
Red-necked grebe, Podiceps grisegena (R)
Eared grebe, Podiceps nigricollis
Western grebe, Aechmorphorus occidentalis
Clark's grebe, Aechmorphorus clarkii

Pigeons and doves
Order: ColumbiformesFamily: Columbidae

Pigeons and doves are stout-bodied birds with short necks and short slender bills with a fleshy cere. They feed on seeds, fruit, and plants.

Rock pigeon, Columba livia (I)
White-crowned pigeon, Patagioenas leucocephala (R)
Red-billed pigeon, Patagioenas flavirostris
Band-tailed pigeon, Patagioenas fasciata
Eurasian collared-dove, Streptopelia decaocto (I)
Passenger pigeon, Ectopistes migratorius (E)
Inca dove, Columbina inca
Common ground dove, Columbina passerina
Ruddy ground dove, Columbina talpacoti (R)
Ruddy quail-dove, Geotrygon montana (R)
White-tipped dove, Leptotila verreauxi
White-winged dove, Zenaida asiatica
Mourning dove, Zenaida macroura

Cuckoos
Order: CuculiformesFamily: Cuculidae

The family Cuculidae includes cuckoos, roadrunners, and anis. These birds are of variable size with slender bodies, long tails, and strong legs.

Groove-billed ani, Crotophaga sulcirostris
Greater roadrunner, Geococcyx californianus
Dark-billed cuckoo, Coccyzus melacoryphus (R)
Yellow-billed cuckoo, Coccyzus americanus
Mangrove cuckoo, Coccyzus minor (R)
Black-billed cuckoo, Coccyzus erythropthalmus

Nightjars and allies
Order: CaprimulgiformesFamily: Caprimulgidae

Nightjars are medium-sized nocturnal birds that usually nest on the ground. They have long wings, short legs, and very short bills. Most have small feet, of little use for walking, and long pointed wings. Their soft plumage is cryptically colored to resemble bark or leaves.

Lesser nighthawk,  Chordeiles acutipennis
Common nighthawk,  Chordeiles minor
Common pauraque,  Nyctidromus albicollis
Common poorwill,  Phalaenoptilus nuttallii
Chuck-will's-widow, Antrostomus carolinensis
Eastern whip-poor-will, Antrostomus vociferus
Mexican whip-poor-will, Antrostomus arizonae

Swifts
Order: ApodiformesFamily: Apodidae

The swifts are small birds which spend the majority of their lives flying. These birds have very short legs and never settle voluntarily on the ground, perching instead only on vertical surfaces. Many swifts have long swept-back wings which resemble a crescent or boomerang.

Black swift, Cypseloides niger (R)
White-collared swift, Streptoprocne zonaris (R)
Chimney swift, Chaetura pelagica
White-throated swift, Aeronautes saxatalis

Hummingbirds
Order: ApodiformesFamily: Trochilidae

Hummingbirds are small birds capable of hovering in mid-air due to the rapid flapping of their wings. They are the only birds that can fly backwards.

Mexican violetear, Colibri thalassinus (R)
Green-breasted mango, Anthracothorax prevostii (R)
Rivoli's hummingbird, Eugenes fulgens
Blue-throated mountain-gem, Lampornis clemenciae
Amethyst-throated mountain-gem, Lampornis amethystinus (R)
Lucifer hummingbird, Calothorax lucifer
Ruby-throated hummingbird, Archilochus colubris
Black-chinned hummingbird, Archilochus alexandri
Anna's hummingbird, Calypte anna
Costa's hummingbird, Calypte costae (R)
Calliope hummingbird, Selasphorus calliope
Rufous hummingbird, Selasphorus rufus
Allen's hummingbird, Selasphorus sasin
Broad-tailed hummingbird, Selasphorus platycercus
Broad-billed hummingbird, Cynanthus latirostris
White-eared hummingbird, Basilinna leucotis (R)
Violet-crowned hummingbird, Leucolia violiceps (R)
Berylline hummingbird, Saucerottia beryllina (R)
Buff-bellied hummingbird, Amazilia yucatanensis

Rails, gallinules, and coots
Order: GruiformesFamily: Rallidae

Rallidae is a large family of small to medium-sized birds which includes the rails, crakes, coots, and gallinules. The most typical family members occupy dense vegetation in damp environments near lakes, swamps, or rivers. In general they are shy and secretive birds, making them difficult to observe. Most species have strong legs and long toes which are well adapted to soft uneven surfaces. They tend to have short, rounded wings and to be weak fliers.

Paint-billed crake, Neocrex erythrops (R)
Spotted rail, Pardirallus maculatus (R)
Clapper rail, Rallus crepitans
King rail, Rallus elegans
Virginia rail, Rallus limicola
Sora, Porzana carolina
Common gallinule, Gallinula galeata
American coot, Fulica americana
Purple gallinule, Porphyrio martinicus
Yellow rail, Coturnicops noveboracensis
Black rail, Laterallus jamaicensis

Limpkin
Order: GruiformesFamily: Aramidae

The limpkin is an odd bird that looks like a large rail, but is skeletally closer to the cranes. It is found in marshes with some trees or scrub. 

Limpkin, Aramus guarauna (R)

Cranes
Order: GruiformesFamily: Gruidae

Cranes are large, long-legged, and long-necked birds. Unlike the similar-looking but unrelated herons, cranes fly with necks outstretched, not pulled back. Most have elaborate and noisy courting displays or "dances".

Sandhill crane, Antigone canadensis
Common crane, Grus grus (R)
Whooping crane, Grus americana

Thick-knees
Order: CharadriiformesFamily: Burhinidae

The thick-knees are a group of waders found worldwide within the tropical zone, with some species also breeding in temperate Europe and Australia. They are medium to large waders with strong black or yellow-black bills, large yellow eyes, and cryptic plumage. Despite being classed as waders, most species have a preference for arid or semi-arid habitats.

Double-striped thick-knee, Burhinus bistriatus (R)

Stilts and avocets
Order: CharadriiformesFamily: Recurvirostridae

Recurvirostridae is a family of large wading birds which includes the avocets and stilts. The avocets have long legs and long up-curved bills. The stilts have extremely long legs and long, thin, straight bills.

Black-necked stilt, Himantopus mexicanus
American avocet, Recurvirostra americana

Oystercatchers
Order: CharadriiformesFamily: Haematopodidae

The oystercatchers are large, obvious, and noisy plover-like birds, with strong bills used for smashing or prying open molluscs.

American oystercatcher, Haematopus palliatus

Plovers and lapwings
Order: CharadriiformesFamily: Charadriidae

The family Charadriidae includes the plovers, dotterels, and lapwings. They are small to medium-sized birds with compact bodies, short thick necks, and long, usually pointed, wings. They are found in open country worldwide, mostly in habitats near water.

Black-bellied plover, Pluvialis squatarola
American golden-plover, Pluvialis dominica
Pacific golden-plover, Pluvialis fulva (R)
Killdeer, Charadrius vociferus
Semipalmated plover, Charadrius semipalmatus
Piping plover, Charadrius melodus
Wilson's plover, Charadrius wilsonia
Collared plover, Charadrius collaris (R)
Snowy plover, Charadrius nivosus
Mountain plover, Charadrius montanus

Jacanas
Order: CharadriiformesFamily: Jacanidae

The jacanas are a family of waders found worldwide within the tropical zone. They are identifiable by their huge feet and claws which enable them to walk on floating vegetation in the shallow lakes that are their preferred habitat.

Northern jacana, Jacana spinosa (R)

Sandpipers and allies
Order: CharadriiformesFamily: Scolopacidae

Scolopacidae is a large diverse family of small to medium-sized shorebirds including the sandpipers, curlews, godwits, shanks, tattlers, woodcocks, snipes, dowitchers, and phalaropes. The majority of these species eat small invertebrates picked out of the mud or soil. Different lengths of legs and bills enable multiple species to feed in the same habitat, particularly on the coast, without direct competition for food.

Upland sandpiper, Bartramia longicauda
Whimbrel, Numenius phaeopus
Eskimo curlew, Numenius borealis (R; believed extinct)
Long-billed curlew, Numenius americanus
Bar-tailed godwit, Limosa lapponica (R)
Black-tailed godwit, Limosa limosa (R)
Hudsonian godwit, Limosa haemastica
Marbled godwit, Limosa fedoa
Ruddy turnstone, Arenaria interpres
Black turnstone, Arenaria melanocephala (R)
Red knot, Calidris canutus
Surfbird, Calidris virgata (R)
Ruff, Calidris pugnax (R)
Sharp-tailed sandpiper, Calidris acuminata (R)
Stilt sandpiper, Calidris himantopus
Curlew sandpiper, Calidris ferruginea (R)
Red-necked stint, Calidris ruficollis (R)
Sanderling, Calidris alba
Dunlin, Calidris alpina
Purple sandpiper, Calidris maritima (R)
Baird's sandpiper, Calidris bairdii
Least sandpiper, Calidris minutilla
White-rumped sandpiper, Calidris fuscicollis 
Buff-breasted sandpiper, Calidris subruficollis
Pectoral sandpiper, Calidris melanotos
Semipalmated sandpiper, Calidris pusilla
Western sandpiper, Calidris mauri
Short-billed dowitcher, Limnodromus griseus
Long-billed dowitcher, Limnodromus scolopaceus
American woodcock, Scolopax minor
Wilson's snipe, Gallinago delicata
Spotted sandpiper, Actitis macularia
Solitary sandpiper, Tringa solitaria
Wandering tattler, Tringa incana (R)
Lesser yellowlegs, Tringa flavipes
Willet, Tringa semipalmata
Spotted redshank, Tringa erythropus (R)
Greater yellowlegs, Tringa melanoleuca 
Wilson's phalarope, Phalaropus tricolor
Red-necked phalarope, Phalaropus lobatus
Red phalarope, Phalaropus fulicarius (R)

Skuas and jaegers
Order: CharadriiformesFamily: Stercorariidae

Skuas and jaegers are in general medium to large birds, typically with gray or brown plumage, often with white markings on the wings. They have longish bills with hooked tips and webbed feet with sharp claws. They look like large dark gulls, but have a fleshy cere above the upper mandible. They are strong, acrobatic fliers.

South polar skua, Stercorarius maccormicki (R)
Pomarine jaeger, Stercorarius pomarinus
Parasitic jaeger, Stercorarius parasiticus
Long-tailed jaeger, Stercorarius longicaudus (R)

Gulls, terns, and skimmers
Order: CharadriiformesFamily: Laridae
 
Laridae is a family of medium to large seabirds and includes gulls, terns, and skimmers. Gulls are typically gray or white, often with black markings on the head or wings. They have stout, longish bills and webbed feet. Terns are a group of generally medium to large seabirds typically with gray or white plumage, often with black markings on the head. Most terns hunt fish by diving but some pick insects off the surface of fresh water. Terns are generally long-lived birds, with several species known to live in excess of 30 years. Skimmers are a small family of tropical tern-like birds. They have an elongated lower mandible which they use to feed by flying low over the water surface and skimming the water for small fish.

Black-legged kittiwake, Rissa tridactyla
Sabine's gull, Xema sabini
Bonaparte's gull, Chroicocephalus philadelphia
Black-headed gull, Chroicocephalus ridibundus (R)
Little gull, Hydrocoleus minutus 
Laughing gull, Leucophaeus atricilla
Franklin's gull, Leucophaeus pipixcan
Black-tailed gull, Larus crassirostris (R)
Heermann's gull, Larus heermanni (R)
Short-billed gull, Larus brachyrhynchus (R)
Ring-billed gull, Larus delawarensis
Western gull, Larus occidentalis (R)
California gull, Larus californicus
Herring gull, Larus argentatus
Yellow-legged gull, Larus cachinnans (R)
Iceland gull, Larus glaucoides
Lesser black-backed gull, Larus fuscus
Slaty-backed gull, Larus schistisagus (R)
Glaucous-winged gull, Larus glaucescens (R)
Glaucous gull, Larus hyperboreus
Great black-backed gull, Larus marinus (R)
Kelp gull, Larus dominicanus (R)
Brown noddy, Anous stolidus (R)
Black noddy, Anous minutus (R)
Sooty tern, Onychoprion fuscatus
Bridled tern, Onychoprion anaethetus
Least tern, Sternula antillarum
Gull-billed tern, Gelochelidon nilotica
Caspian tern, Hydroprogne caspia
Black tern, Chlidonias niger
Roseate tern, Sterna dougallii (R)
Common tern, Sterna hirundo
Arctic tern, Sterna paradisaea (R)
Forster's tern, Sterna forsteri
Royal tern, Thalasseus maximus
Sandwich tern, Thalasseus sandvicensis
Elegant tern, Thalasseus elegans (R)
Black skimmer, Rynchops niger

Tropicbirds
Order: PhaethontiformesFamily: Phaethontidae

Tropicbirds are slender white birds of tropical oceans with exceptionally long central tail feathers. Their long wings have black markings, as does the head.

White-tailed tropicbird, Phaethon lepturus (R)
Red-billed tropicbird, Phaethon rubricauda (R)

Loons
Order: GaviiformesFamily: Gaviidae

Loons are aquatic birds, the size of a large duck, to which they are unrelated. Their plumage is largely gray or black, and they have spear-shaped bills. Loons swim well and fly adequately, but are almost hopeless on land, because their legs are placed towards the rear of the body.

Red-throated loon, Gavia stellata
Pacific loon, Gavia pacifica
Common loon, Gavia immer
Yellow-billed loon, Gavia adamsii (R)

Albatrosses
Order: ProcellariiformesFamily: Diomedeidae

The albatrosses are among the largest of flying birds, and the great albatrosses of the genus Diomedea have the largest wingspans of any extant birds.

Yellow-nosed albatross, Thalassarche chlororhynchos (R)

Southern storm-petrels
Order: ProcellariiformesFamily: Oceanitidae

The storm-petrels are the smallest seabirds, relatives of the petrels, feeding on planktonic crustaceans and small fish picked from the surface, typically while hovering. The flight is fluttering and sometimes bat-like. Until 2018, this family's three species were included with the other storm-petrels in family Hydrobatidae.

Wilson's storm-petrel, Oceanites oceanicus (R)

Northern storm-petrels
Order: ProcellariiformesFamily: Hydrobatidae

Though the members of this family are similar in many respects to the southern storm-petrels, including their general appearance and habits, there are enough genetic differences to warrant their placement in a separate family.

Leach's storm-petrel, Hydrobates leucorhous (R)
Band-rumped storm-petrel, Hydrobates castro

Shearwaters and petrels
Order: ProcellariiformesFamily: Procellariidae

The procellariids are the main group of medium-sized "true petrels", characterized by united nostrils with medium septum and a long outer functional primary.

Trindade petrel, Pterodroma arminjoniana (R)
Black-capped petrel, Pterodroma hasitata (R)
Stejneger's petrel, Pterodroma longirostris (R)
White-chinned petrel, Procellaria aequinoctialis (R)
Cory's shearwater, Calonectris diomedea
Sooty shearwater, Ardenna griseus (R)
Great shearwater, Ardenna gravis (R)
Manx shearwater, Puffinus puffinus (R)
Audubon's shearwater, Puffinus lherminieri

Storks
Order: CiconiiformesFamily: Ciconiidae

Storks are large, heavy, long-legged, long-necked wading birds with long stout bills and wide wingspans. They lack the powder down that other wading birds such as herons, spoonbills, and ibises use to clean off fish slime. Storks lack a pharynx and are mute.

Jabiru, Jabiru mycteria (R)
Wood stork, Mycteria americana

Frigatebirds
Order: SuliformesFamily: Fregatidae

Frigatebirds are large seabirds usually found over tropical oceans. They are large, black, or black-and-white, with long wings and deeply forked tails. The males have colored inflatable throat pouches. They do not swim or walk and cannot take off from a flat surface. Having the largest wingspan-to-body-weight ratio of any bird, they are essentially aerial, able to stay aloft for more than a week.

Magnificent frigatebird, Fregata magnificens

Boobies and gannets
Order: SuliformesFamily: Sulidae

The sulids comprise the gannets and boobies. Both groups are medium-large coastal seabirds that plunge-dive for fish.

Masked booby, Sula dactylatra
Blue-footed booby, Sula nebouxii (R)
Brown booby, Sula leucogaster
Red-footed booby, Sula sula (R)
Northern gannet, Morus bassanus

Anhingas
Order: SuliformesFamily: Anhingidae

Anhingas are cormorant-like water birds with very long necks and long straight beaks. They are fish eaters which often swim with only their neck above the water.

Anhinga, Anhinga anhinga

Cormorants and shags
Order: SuliformesFamily: Phalacrocoracidae

Cormorants are medium-to-large aquatic birds, usually with mainly dark plumage and areas of colored skin on the face. The bill is long, thin, and sharply hooked. Their feet are four-toed and webbed.

Double-crested cormorant, Nannopterum auritum
Neotropic cormorant, Nannopterum brasilianum

Pelicans
Order: PelecaniformesFamily: Pelecanidae

Pelicans are very large water birds with a distinctive pouch under their beak. Like other birds in the order Pelecaniformes, they have four webbed toes.

American white pelican, Pelecanus erythrorhynchos
Brown pelican, Pelecanus occidentalis

Herons, egrets, and bitterns
Order: PelecaniformesFamily: Ardeidae

The family Ardeidae contains the herons, egrets, and bitterns. Herons and egrets are medium to large wading birds with long necks and legs. Bitterns tend to be shorter necked and more secretive. Members of Ardeidae fly with their necks retracted, unlike other long-necked birds such as storks, ibises, and spoonbills.

American bittern, Botaurus lentiginosus
Least bittern, Ixobrychus exilis
Bare-throated tiger-heron, Tigrisoma mexicanum (R)
Great blue heron, Ardea herodias
Great egret, Ardea alba
Snowy egret, Egretta thula
Little blue heron, Egretta caerulea
Tricolored heron, Egretta tricolor
Reddish egret, Egretta rufescens
Cattle egret, Bubulcus ibis
Green heron, Butorides virescens
Black-crowned night-heron, Nycticorax nycticorax
Yellow-crowned night-heron, Nyctanassa violacea

Ibises and spoonbills
Order: PelecaniformesFamily: Threskiornithidae

The family Threskiornithidae includes the ibises and spoonbills. They have long, broad wings. Their bodies tend to be elongated, the neck more so, with rather long legs. The bill is also long, decurved in the case of the ibises, straight and distinctively flattened in the spoonbills.

White ibis, Eudocimus albus
Glossy ibis, Plegadis falcinellus
White-faced ibis, Plegadis chihi
Roseate spoonbill, Platalea ajaja

New World vultures
Order: CathartiformesFamily: Cathartidae

The New World vultures are not closely related to Old World vultures, but superficially resemble them because of convergent evolution. Like the Old World vultures, they are scavengers. However, unlike Old World vultures, which find carcasses by sight, New World vultures have a good sense of smell with which they locate carcasses.

Black vulture, Coragyps atratus
Turkey vulture, Cathartes aura

Osprey
Order: AccipitriformesFamily: Pandionidae

Pandionidae is a monotypic family of fish-eating birds of prey.  Its single species possesses a very large and powerful hooked beak, strong legs, strong talons, and keen eyesight.

Osprey, Pandion haliaetus

Hawks, eagles, and kites
Order: AccipitriformesFamily: Accipitridae

Accipitridae is a family of birds of prey which includes hawks, eagles, kites, harriers, and Old World vultures. These birds have very large powerful hooked beaks for tearing flesh from their prey, strong legs, powerful talons, and keen eyesight.

White-tailed kite, Elanus leucurus
Hook-billed kite, Chondrohierax uncinatus
Swallow-tailed kite, Elanoides forficatus
Golden eagle, Aquila chrysaetos
Double-toothed kite, Harpagus bidentatus (R)
Northern harrier, Circus hudsonius
Sharp-shinned hawk, Accipiter striatus
Cooper's hawk, Accipiter cooperii
Northern goshawk, Accipiter gentilis (R)
Bald eagle, Haliaeetus leucocephalus
Mississippi kite, Ictinia mississippiensis
Steller's sea-eagle, Haliaeetus pelagicus (R)
Crane hawk, Geranospiza caerulescens (R)
Snail kite, Rostrhamus sociabilis (R)
Common black hawk, Buteogallus anthracinus
Great black hawk, Buteogallus urubitinga (R)
Roadside hawk, Rupornis magnirostris (R)
Harris's hawk, Parabuteo unicinctus
White-tailed hawk, Geranoaetus albicaudatus
Gray hawk, Buteo plagiatus
Red-shouldered hawk, Buteo lineatus
Broad-winged hawk, Buteo platypterus
Short-tailed hawk, Buteo brachyurus (R)
Swainson's hawk, Buteo swainsoni
Zone-tailed hawk, Buteo albonotatus
Red-tailed hawk, Buteo jamaicensis
Rough-legged hawk, Buteo lagopus
Ferruginous hawk, Buteo regalis

Barn-owls
Order: StrigiformesFamily: Tytonidae

Owls in the family Tytonidae are medium to large owls with large heads and characteristic heart-shaped faces.

Barn owl, Tyto alba

Owls
Order: StrigiformesFamily: Strigidae

Typical or "true" owls are small to large solitary nocturnal birds of prey. They have large forward-facing eyes and ears, a hawk-like beak, and a conspicuous circle of feathers around each eye called a facial disk.

Flammulated owl, Psiloscops flammeolus
Western screech-owl, Megascops kennicottii
Eastern screech-owl, Megascops asio
Great horned owl, Bubo virginianus
Snowy owl, Bubo scandiacus (R)
Northern pygmy-owl, Glaucidium gnoma (R)
Ferruginous pygmy-owl, Glaucidium brasilianum
Elf owl, Micrathene whitneyi
Burrowing owl, Athene cunicularia
Mottled owl, Strix virgata (R)
Spotted owl, Strix occidentalis
Barred owl, Strix varia
Long-eared owl, Asio otus
Stygian owl, Asio stygius (R)
Short-eared owl, Asio flammeus
Northern saw-whet owl, Aegolius acadicus (R)

Trogons
Order: TrogoniformesFamily: Trogonidae

Trogons are residents of tropical forests worldwide with the greatest diversity in Central and South America. They feed on insects and fruit, and their broad bills and weak legs reflect their diet and arboreal habits.

Elegant trogon, Trogon elegans (R)

Kingfishers
Order: CoraciiformesFamily: Alcedinidae

Kingfishers are medium-sized birds with large heads, long, pointed bills, short legs, and stubby tails.

Ringed kingfisher, Megaceryle torquata
Belted kingfisher, Megaceryle alcyon
Amazon kingfisher, Chloroceryle amazona (R)
Green kingfisher, Chloroceryle americana

Woodpeckers
Order: PiciformesFamily: Picidae

Woodpeckers are small to medium-sized birds with chisel-like beaks, short legs, stiff tails, and long tongues used for capturing insects. Some species have feet with two toes pointing forward and two backward, while several species have only three toes. Many woodpeckers have the habit of tapping noisily on tree trunks with their beaks.

Lewis's woodpecker, Melanerpes lewis
Red-headed woodpecker, Melanerpes erythrocephalus
Acorn woodpecker, Melanerpes formicivorus
Golden-fronted woodpecker, Melanerpes aurifrons
Red-bellied woodpecker, Melanerpes carolinus
Williamson's sapsucker, Sphyrapicus thyroideus
Yellow-bellied sapsucker, Sphyrapicus varius
Red-naped sapsucker, Sphyrapicus nuchalis
Red-breasted sapsucker, Sphyrapicus ruber (R)
Downy woodpecker, Dryobates pubescens
Ladder-backed woodpecker, Dryobates scalaris
Red-cockaded woodpecker, Dryobates borealis
Hairy woodpecker, Dryobates villosus
Northern flicker, Colaptes auratus
Pileated woodpecker, Dryocopus pileatus
Ivory-billed woodpecker, Campephilus principalis (R)

Falcons and caracaras
Order: FalconiformesFamily: Falconidae

Falconidae is a family of diurnal birds of prey, notably the falcons and caracaras. They differ from hawks, eagles, and kites in that they kill with their beaks instead of their talons.

Collared forest-falcon, Micrastur semitorquatus (R)
Crested caracara, Caracara plancus
American kestrel, Falco sparverius
Merlin, Falco columbarius
Aplomado falcon, Falco femoralis (RI)
Bat falcon, Falco rufigularis (R)
Gyrfalcon, Falco rusticolus (R)
Peregrine falcon, Falco peregrinus
Prairie falcon, Falco mexicanus

New World and African parrots
Order: PsittaciformesFamily: Psittacidae

Characteristic features of parrots include a strong curved bill, an upright stance, strong legs, and clawed zygodactyl feet. Many parrots are vividly colored, and some are multi-colored. Most of the more than 150 species in this family are found in the New World.

Monk parakeet, Myiopsitta monachus (I)
Carolina parakeet, Conuropsis carolinensis (E)
Green parakeet, Psittacara holochlorus (u)
Thick-billed parrot, Rhynchopsitta pachyrhyncha (accidental/historical) 
Red-crowned parrot, Amazona viridigenalis (u)

Tityras and allies
Order: PasseriformesFamily: Tityridae

Tityridae is family of suboscine passerine birds found in forest and woodland in the Neotropics. The approximately 30 species in this family were formerly lumped with the families Pipridae and Cotingidae. They are small to medium-sized birds.

Masked tityra, Tityra semifasciata (R)
Rose-throated becard, Pachyramphus aglaiae (R)

Tyrant flycatchers
Order: PasseriformesFamily: Tyrannidae

Tyrant flycatchers are Passerine birds which occur throughout North and South America. They superficially resemble the Old World flycatchers, but are more robust and have stronger bills. They do not have the sophisticated vocal capabilities of the songbirds. Most, but not all, are rather plain. As the name implies, most are insectivorous.

Northern beardless-tyrannulet, Camptostoma imberbe
Greenish elaenia, Myiopagis viridicata (R)
Small-billed elaenia, Elaenia parvirostris (R)
White-crested elaenia, Elaenia albiceps (R)
Dusky-capped flycatcher, Myiarchus tuberculifer
Ash-throated flycatcher, Myiarchus cinerascens
Nutting's flycatcher, Myiarchus nuttingi (R)
Great crested flycatcher, Myiarchus crinitus
Brown-crested flycatcher, Myiarchus tyrannulus
Great kiskadee, Pitangus sulphuratus
Social flycatcher, Myiozetetes similis (R)
Sulphur-bellied flycatcher, Myiodynastes luteiventris (R)
Piratic flycatcher, Legatus leucophaius (R)
Variegated flycatcher, Empidonomus varius (R)
Tropical kingbird, Tyrannus melancholicus
Couch's kingbird, Tyrannus couchii
Cassin's kingbird, Tyrannus vociferans
Thick-billed kingbird, Tyrannus crassirostris (R)
Western kingbird, Tyrannus verticalis
Eastern kingbird, Tyrannus tyrannus
Gray kingbird, Tyrannus dominicensis (R)
Scissor-tailed flycatcher, Tyrannus forficatus
Fork-tailed flycatcher, Tyrannus savana (R)
Tufted flycatcher, Mitrephanes phaeocercus (R)
Olive-sided flycatcher, Contopus cooperi
Greater pewee, Contopus pertinax (R)
Western wood-pewee, Contopus sordidulus
Eastern wood-pewee, Contopus virens
Yellow-bellied flycatcher, Empidonax flaviventris
Acadian flycatcher, Empidonax virescens
Alder flycatcher, Empidonax alnorum
Willow flycatcher, Empidonax traillii
Least flycatcher, Empidonax minimus
Hammond's flycatcher, Empidonax hammondii
Gray flycatcher, Empidonax wrightii
Dusky flycatcher, Empidonax oberholseri
Pacific-slope flycatcher, Empidonax difficilis (R)
Cordilleran flycatcher, Empidonax occidentalis
Buff-breasted flycatcher, Empidonax fulvifrons (R)
Black phoebe, Sayornis nigricans
Eastern phoebe, Sayornis phoebe
Say's phoebe, Sayornis saya
Vermilion flycatcher, Pyrocephalus rubinus

Antbirds
Order: PasseriformesFamily: Thamnophilidae

The antbirds are a large family of small passerine birds of subtropical and tropical Central and South America. They are forest birds which tend to feed on insects on or near the ground.

Barred antshrike, Thamnophilus doliatus (R)

Vireos, shrike-babblers, and erpornis
Order: PasseriformesFamily: Vireonidae

The vireos are a group of small to medium-sized passerine birds mostly restricted to the New World, though a few other species in the family are found in Asia. They are typically greenish in color and resemble wood-warblers apart from their heavier bills.

Black-capped vireo, Vireo atricapilla
White-eyed vireo, Vireo griseus
Bell's vireo, Vireo bellii
Gray vireo, Vireo vicinior
Hutton's vireo, Vireo huttoni
Yellow-throated vireo, Vireo flavifrons
Cassin's vireo, Vireo cassinii
Blue-headed vireo, Vireo solitarius
Plumbeous vireo, Vireo plumbeus
Philadelphia vireo, Vireo philadelphicus
Warbling vireo, Vireo gilvus
Red-eyed vireo, Vireo olivaceus
Yellow-green vireo, Vireo flavoviridis
Black-whiskered vireo, Vireo altiloquus (R)
Yucatan vireo, Vireo magister (R)

Shrikes
Order: PasseriformesFamily: Laniidae

Shrikes are passerine birds known for their habit of catching other birds and small animals and impaling the uneaten portions of their bodies on thorns. A shrike's beak is hooked, like that of a typical bird of prey.

Loggerhead shrike, Lanius ludovicianus
Northern shrike, Lanius borealis

Crows, jays, and magpies
Order: PasseriformesFamily: Corvidae

The family Corvidae includes crows, ravens, jays, choughs, magpies, treepies, nutcrackers, and ground jays. Corvids are above average in size among the Passeriformes, and some of the larger species show high levels of intelligence.

Brown jay, Psilorhinus morio (R)
Green jay, Cyanocorax yncas
Pinyon jay, Gymnorhinus cyanocephalus (R)
Steller's jay, Cyanocitta stelleri
Blue jay, Cyanocitta cristata
Woodhouse's scrub-jay, Aphelocoma woodhouseii
Mexican jay, Aphelocoma wollweberi
Clark's nutcracker, Nucifraga columbiana (R)
Black-billed magpie, Pica hudsonia (R)
American crow, Corvus brachyrhynchos
Tamaulipas crow, Corvus imparatus (R)
Fish crow, Corvus ossifragus
Chihuahuan raven, Corvus cryptoleucus
Common raven, Corvus corax

Penduline-tits
Order: PasseriformesFamily: Remizidae

The only member of this family in the New World, the verdin is one of the smallest passerines in North America. Verdins are insectivores, and are usually solitary except when they pair up to construct their conspicuous nests.

Verdin, Auriparus flaviceps

Tits, chickadees, and titmice
Order: PasseriformesFamily: Paridae

The Paridae are mainly small stocky woodland species with short stout bills. Some have crests. They are adaptable birds, with a mixed diet including seeds and insects.

Carolina chickadee, Poecile carolinensis
Black-capped chickadee, Poecile atricapilla (R)
Mountain chickadee, Poecile gambeli
Juniper titmouse, Baeolophus ridgwayi
Tufted titmouse, Baeolophus bicolor
Black-crested titmouse, Baeolophus atricristatus

Larks
Order: PasseriformesFamily: Alaudidae

Larks are small terrestrial birds with often extravagant songs and display flights. Most larks are fairly dull in appearance. Their food is insects and seeds.

Horned lark, Eremophila alpestris

Swallows
Order: PasseriformesFamily: Hirundinidae

The family Hirundinidae is adapted to aerial feeding. They have a slender streamlined body, long pointed wings, and a short bill with a wide gape. The feet are adapted to perching rather than walking, and the front toes are partially joined at the base.

Blue-and-white swallow, Pygochelidon cyanoleuca (R) (not on the AOS checklist)
Bank swallow, Riparia riparia
Tree swallow, Tachycineta bicolor
Violet-green swallow, Tachycineta thalassina
Northern rough-winged swallow, Stelgidopteryx serripennis
Purple martin, Progne subis
Gray-breasted martin, Progne chalybea (R)
Barn swallow, Hirundo rustica
Cliff swallow, Petrochelidon pyrrhonota
Cave swallow, Petrochelidon fulva

Long-tailed tits
Order: PasseriformesFamily: Aegithalidae

The long-tailed tits are a family of small passerine birds with medium to long tails. They make woven bag nests in trees. Most eat a mixed diet which includes insects.

Bushtit, Psaltriparus minimus

Bulbuls
Order: PasseriformesFamily: Pycnonotidae

The bulbuls are a family of medium-sized songbirds native to Africa and tropical Asia. They are noisy and gregarious and often have beautiful songs.

Red-vented bulbul, Pycnonotus cafer (I)

Kinglets
Order: PasseriformesFamily: Regulidae

The kinglets and "crests" are a small family of birds which resemble some warblers. They are very small insectivorous birds. The adults have colored crowns, giving rise to their name.

Ruby-crowned kinglet, Corthylio calendula
Golden-crowned kinglet, Regulus satrapa

Waxwings
Order: PasseriformesFamily: Bombycillidae

The waxwings are a group of passerine birds with soft silky plumage and unique red tips to some of the wing feathers. In the Bohemian and cedar waxwings, these tips look like sealing wax and give the group its name. These are arboreal birds of northern forests. They live on insects in summer and berries in winter.

Bohemian waxwing, Bombycilla garrulus (R)
Cedar waxwing, Bombycilla cedrorum

Silky-flycatchers
Order: PasseriformesFamily: Ptiliogonatidae

The silky-flycatchers are a small family of passerine birds which occur mainly in Central America. They are related to waxwings and most species have small crests.

Gray silky-flycatcher, Ptiliogonys cinereus (R)
Phainopepla, Phainopepla nitens

Nuthatches
Order: PasseriformesFamily: Sittidae

Nuthatches are small woodland birds. They have the unusual ability to climb down trees head first, unlike other birds which can only go upwards. Nuthatches have big heads, short tails, and powerful bills and feet.

Red-breasted nuthatch, Sitta canadensis
White-breasted nuthatch, Sitta carolinensis
Pygmy nuthatch, Sitta pygmaea
Brown-headed nuthatch, Sitta pusilla

Treecreepers
Order: PasseriformesFamily: Certhiidae

Treecreepers are small woodland birds, brown above and white below. They have thin pointed down-curved bills, which they use to extricate insects from bark. They have stiff tail feathers, like woodpeckers, which they use to support themselves on vertical trees.

Brown creeper, Certhia americana

Gnatcatchers
Order: PasseriformesFamily: Polioptilidae

These dainty birds resemble Old World warblers in their structure and habits, moving restlessly through the foliage seeking insects. The gnatcatchers are mainly soft bluish gray in color and have the typical insectivore's long sharp bill. Many species have distinctive black head patterns (especially males) and long, regularly cocked, black-and-white tails.

Blue-gray gnatcatcher, Polioptila caerulea
Black-tailed gnatcatcher, Polioptila melanura

Wrens
Order: PasseriformesFamily: Troglodytidae

Wrens are small and inconspicuous birds, except for their loud songs. They have short wings and thin down-turned bills. Several species often hold their tails upright. All are insectivorous.

Rock wren, Salpinctes obsoletus
Canyon wren, Catherpes mexicanus
House wren, Troglodytes aedon
Winter wren, Troglodytes hiemalis
Sedge wren, Cistothorus platensis
Marsh wren, Cistothorus palustris
Carolina wren, Thryothorus ludovicianus
Bewick's wren, Thryomanes bewickii
Cactus wren, Campylorhynchus brunneicapillus

Mockingbirds and thrashers
Order: PasseriformesFamily: Mimidae

The mimids are a family of passerine birds which includes thrashers, mockingbirds, tremblers, and the New World catbirds. These birds are notable for their vocalization, especially their remarkable ability to mimic a wide variety of birds and other sounds heard outdoors. The species tend towards dull grays and browns in their appearance.

Blue mockingbird, Melanotis caerulescens (R)
Black catbird, Melanoptila glabrirostris (R)
Gray catbird, Dumetella carolinensis
Curve-billed thrasher, Toxostoma curvirostre
Brown thrasher, Toxostoma rufum
Long-billed thrasher, Toxostoma longirostre
Crissal thrasher, Toxostoma crissale
Sage thrasher, Oreoscoptes montanus
Northern mockingbird, Mimus polyglottos

Starlings
Order: PasseriformesFamily: Sturnidae

Starlings and mynas are small to medium-sized Old World passerine birds with strong feet. Their flight is strong and direct and most are very gregarious. Their preferred habitat is fairly open country, and they eat insects and fruit. The plumage of several species is dark with a metallic sheen.

European starling, Sturnus vulgaris (I)

Dippers
Order: PasseriformesFamily: Cinclidae

Dippers are a group of perching birds whose habitat includes aquatic environments in the Americas, Europe, and Asia. These birds have adaptations which allows them to submerge and walk on the bottom to feed on insect larvae.

American dipper, Cinclus mexicanus (R)

Thrushes and allies
Order: PasseriformesFamily: Turdidae

The thrushes are a group of passerine birds that occur mainly but not exclusively in the Old World. They are plump, soft plumaged, small to medium-sized insectivores or sometimes omnivores, often feeding on the ground. Many have attractive songs.

Eastern bluebird, Sialia sialis
Western bluebird, Sialia mexicana
Mountain bluebird, Sialia currucoides
Townsend's solitaire, Myadestes townsendi
Orange-billed nightingale-thrush, Catharus aurantiirostris (R)
Black-headed nightingale-thrush, Catharus mexicanus (R)
Veery, Catharus fuscescens
Gray-cheeked thrush, Catharus minimus
Swainson's thrush, Catharus ustulatus
Hermit thrush, Catharus guttatus
Wood thrush, Hylocichla mustelina
Clay-colored thrush, Turdus grayi
White-throated thrush, Turdus assimilis (R)
Rufous-backed robin, Turdus rufopalliatus (R)
American robin, Turdus migratorius
Varied thrush, Ixoreus naevius (R)
Aztec thrush, Ridgwayia pinicola (R)

Old World flycatchers
Order: PasseriformesFamily: Muscicapidae

The Old World flycatchers form a large family of small passerine birds. These are mainly small arboreal insectivores, many of which, as the name implies, take their prey on the wing.

Northern wheatear, Oenanthe oenanthe (R)

Olive warbler
Order: PasseriformesFamily: Peucedramidae

The olive warbler has a gray body with some olive-green on the wings and two white wing bars. The male's head and breast are orange and there is a black patch through the eye. This is the only species in its family.

Olive warbler, Peucedramus taeniatus (R)

Waxbills and allies
Order: PasseriformesFamily: Estrildidae

The estrildid finches are small passerine birds native to the Old World tropics. They are gregarious and often colonial seed eaters with short thick but pointed bills. They are all similar in structure and habits, but have wide variation in plumage colors and patterns.

Scaly-breasted munia, Lonchura punctulata (I)

Old World sparrows
Order: PasseriformesFamily: Passeridae

Old World sparrows are small passerine birds. In general, sparrows tend to be small plump brownish or grayish birds with short tails and short powerful beaks. Sparrows are seed eaters, but they also consume small insects.

House sparrow, Passer domesticus (I)

Wagtails and pipits
Order: PasseriformesFamily: Motacillidae

Motacillidae is a family of small passerine birds with medium to long tails. They include the wagtails, longclaws, and pipits. They are slender ground-feeding insectivores of open country.

White wagtail, Motacilla alba (R)
American pipit, Anthus rubescens
Sprague's pipit, Anthus spragueii

Finches, euphonias, and allies
Order: PasseriformesFamily: Fringillidae

Finches are seed-eating passerine birds that are small to moderately large and have a strong beak, usually conical and in some species very large. All have twelve tail feathers and nine primaries. These birds have a bouncing flight with alternating bouts of flapping and gliding on closed wings, and most sing well.

Evening grosbeak, Coccothraustes vespertinus (R)
Pine grosbeak, Pinicola enucleator (R)
Gray-crowned rosy-finch, Leucosticte tephrocotis (R)
House finch, Haemorhous mexicanus
Purple finch, Haemorhous purpureus
Cassin's finch, Haemorhous cassinii
Common redpoll, Acanthis flammea (R)
Red crossbill, Loxia curvirostra
White-winged crossbill, Loxia leucoptera (R)
Pine siskin, Spinus pinus
Lesser goldfinch, Spinus psaltria
Lawrence's goldfinch, Spinus lawrencei (R)
American goldfinch, Spinus tristis

Longspurs and snow buntings
Order: PasseriformesFamily: Calcariidae

The Calcariidae are a group of passerine birds that had been traditionally grouped with the New World sparrows, but differ in a number of respects and are usually found in open grassy areas.

Lapland longspur, Calcarius lapponicus
Chestnut-collared longspur, Calcarius ornatus
Smith's longspur, Calcarius pictus
Thick-billed longspur, Rhyncophanes mccownii
Snow bunting, Plectrophenax nivalis (R)

New World sparrows
Order: PasseriformesFamily: Passerellidae

Until 2017, these species were considered part of the family Emberizidae. Most of the species are known as sparrows, but these birds are not closely related to the Old World sparrows which are in the family Passeridae. Many of these have distinctive head patterns.

Botteri's sparrow, Peucaea botterii
Cassin's sparrow, Peucaea cassinii
Bachman's sparrow, Peucaea aestivalis
Grasshopper sparrow, Ammodramus savannarum
Olive sparrow, Arremonops rufivirgatus
Black-throated sparrow, Amphispiza bilineata
Lark sparrow, Chondestes grammacus
Lark bunting, Calamospiza melanocorys
Chipping sparrow, Spizella passerina
Clay-colored sparrow, Spizella pallida
Black-chinned sparrow, Spizella atrogularis
Field sparrow, Spizella pusilla
Brewer's sparrow, Spizella breweri
Fox sparrow, Passerella iliaca
American tree sparrow, Spizelloides arborea
Dark-eyed junco, Junco hyemalis
Yellow-eyed junco, Junco phaeonotus (R)
White-crowned sparrow, Zonotrichia leucophrys
Golden-crowned sparrow, Zonotrichia atricapilla (R)
Harris's sparrow, Zonotrichia querula
White-throated sparrow, Zonotrichia albicollis
Sagebrush sparrow, Artemisiospiza nevadensis
Vesper sparrow, Pooecetes gramineus
LeConte's sparrow, Ammospiza leconteii
Seaside sparrow, Ammospiza maritima
Nelson's sparrow, Ammospiza nelsoni
Baird's sparrow, Centronyx bairdii
Henslow's sparrow, Centronyx henslowii
Savannah sparrow, Passerculus sandwichensis
Song sparrow, Melospiza melodia
Lincoln's sparrow, Melospiza lincolnii
Swamp sparrow, Melospiza georgiana
Canyon towhee, Melozone fuscus
Rufous-crowned sparrow, Aimophila ruficeps
Green-tailed towhee, Pipilo chlorurus
Spotted towhee, Pipilo maculatus 
Eastern towhee, Pipilo erythrophthalmus

Yellow-breasted chat
Order: PasseriformesFamily: Icteriidae

This species was historically placed in the wood-warblers (Parulidae) but nonetheless most authorities were unsure if it belonged there. It was placed in its own family in 2017.

Yellow-breasted chat, Icteria virens

Troupials and allies
Order: PasseriformesFamily: Icteridae

The icterids are a group of small to medium-sized, often colorful passerine birds restricted to the New World and include the grackles, New World blackbirds, and New World orioles. Most species have black as a predominant plumage color which is often enlivened by yellow, orange, or red.

Yellow-headed blackbird, Xanthocephalus xanthocephalus
Bobolink, Dolichonyx oryzivorus
Chihuahuan meadowlark, Sturnella lilianae
Eastern meadowlark, Sturnella magna
Western meadowlark, Sturnella neglecta
Black-vented oriole, Icterus wagleri (R)
Orchard oriole, Icterus spurius
Hooded oriole, Icterus cucullatus
Streak-backed oriole, Icterus pustulatus (R)
Bullock's oriole, Icterus bullockii
Altamira oriole, Icterus gularis
Audubon's oriole, Icterus graduacauda
Baltimore oriole, Icterus galbula
Scott's oriole, Icterus parisorum
Red-winged blackbird, Agelaius phoeniceus
Shiny cowbird, Molothrus bonariensis (R)
Bronzed cowbird, Molothrus aeneus
Brown-headed cowbird, Molothrus ater
Rusty blackbird, Euphagus carolinus
Brewer's blackbird, Euphagus cyanocephalus
Common grackle, Quiscalus quiscula
Boat-tailed grackle, Quiscalus major
Great-tailed grackle, Quiscalus mexicanus

New World warblers
Order: PasseriformesFamily: Parulidae

The wood-warblers are a group of small often colorful passerine birds restricted to the New World. Most are arboreal, but some are more terrestrial. Most members of this family are insectivores.

Ovenbird, Seiurus aurocapilla
Worm-eating warbler, Helmitheros vermivorum
Louisiana waterthrush, Parkesia motacilla
Northern waterthrush, Parkesia noveboracensis
Golden-winged warbler, Vermivora chrysoptera
Blue-winged warbler, Vermivora cyanoptera
Black-and-white warbler, Mniotilta varia
Prothonotary warbler, Protonotaria citrea
Swainson's warbler, Limnothlypis swainsonii
Tennessee warbler, Leiothlypis peregrina
Orange-crowned warbler, Leiothlypis celata
Colima warbler, Leiothlypis crissalis
Lucy's warbler, Leiothlypis luciae
Nashville warbler, Leiothlypis ruficapilla
Virginia's warbler, Leiothlypis virginiae
Connecticut warbler, Oporornis agilis (R)
Gray-crowned yellowthroat, Geothlypis poliocephala (R)
MacGillivray's warbler, Geothlypis tolmiei
Mourning warbler, Geothlypis philadelphia
Kentucky warbler, Geothlypis formosa
Common yellowthroat, Geothlypis trichas
Hooded warbler, Setophaga citrina
American redstart, Setophaga ruticilla
Cape May warbler, Setophaga tigrina
Cerulean warbler, Setophaga cerulea
Northern parula, Setophaga americana
Tropical parula, Setophaga pitiayumi
Magnolia warbler, Setophaga magnolia
Bay-breasted warbler, Setophaga castanea
Blackburnian warbler, Setophaga fusca
Yellow warbler, Setophaga petechia
Chestnut-sided warbler, Setophaga pensylvanica
Blackpoll warbler, Setophaga striata
Black-throated blue warbler, Setophaga caerulescens
Palm warbler, Setophaga palmarum
Pine warbler, Setophaga pinus
Yellow-rumped warbler, Setophaga coronata
Yellow-throated warbler, Setophaga dominica
Prairie warbler, Setophaga discolor
Grace's warbler, Setophaga graciae
Black-throated gray warbler, Setophaga nigrescens
Townsend's warbler, Setophaga townsendi
Hermit warbler, Setophaga occidentalis
Golden-cheeked warbler, Setophaga chrysoparia
Black-throated green warbler, Setophaga virens
Fan-tailed warbler, Basileuterus lachrymosus (R)
Rufous-capped warbler, Basileuterus rufifrons (R)
Golden-crowned warbler, Basileuterus culicivorus (R)
Canada warbler, Cardellina canadensis
Wilson's warbler, Cardellina pusilla
Red-faced warbler, Cardellina rubrifrons
Painted redstart, Myioborus pictus
Slate-throated redstart, Myioborus miniatus (R)

Cardinals and allies
Order: PasseriformesFamily: Cardinalidae

The cardinals are a family of robust seed-eating birds with strong bills. They are typically associated with open woodland. The sexes usually have distinct plumages.

Hepatic tanager, Piranga flava
Summer tanager, Piranga rubra
Scarlet tanager, Piranga olivacea
Western tanager, Piranga ludoviciana
Flame-colored tanager, Piranga bidentata (R)
Crimson-collared grosbeak, Rhodothraupis celaeno (R)
Northern cardinal, Cardinalis cardinalis
Pyrrhuloxia, Cardinalis sinuatus
Yellow grosbeak, Pheuticus chrysopeplus (R)
Rose-breasted grosbeak, Pheucticus ludovicianus
Black-headed grosbeak, Pheucticus melanocephalus
Blue bunting, Cyanocompsa parellina (R)
Blue grosbeak, Passerina caerulea
Lazuli bunting, Passerina amoena
Indigo bunting, Passerina cyanea
Varied bunting, Passerina versicolor
Painted bunting, Passerina ciris
Dickcissel, Spiza americana

Tanagers and allies
Order: PasseriformesFamily: Thraupidae

The tanagers are a large group of small to medium-sized passerine birds restricted to the New World, mainly in the tropics. Many species are brightly colored. As a family they are omnivorous, but individual species specialize in eating fruits, seeds, insects, or other types of food.

Red-legged honeycreeper, Cyanerpes cyaneus (R)
Yellow-faced grassquit, Tiaris olivaceus (R)
Morelet's seedeater, Sporophila morelleti

Presumptive species
Written descriptions of sight records of these species have been accepted by the TBRC. However, they did not meet the criteria (identifiable specimen, photo, video, or audio recording) for inclusion on the official list.

Murre species, Uria sp.
Razorbill, Alca torda
Crescent-chested warbler, Oreothlypis superciliosa

Notes

References

See also
List of birds of Big Bend National Park
List of birds of Guadalupe Mountains National Park

External links
Texas Ornithological Society
Texas Bird Records Committee
Official Texas State List

Texas
Birds